Suam, Kenya is a settlement in the Trans-Nzoia County of Kenya. It sits across the Suam River from Suam, Uganda, at the international border between the two countries.

Location
The coordinates of Suam, Kenya are:1°12'57.0"N, 34°44'03.0"E (Latitude:1.215825; Longitude:34.734172).

Overview
In 2013, the Trans-Nzoia County government received a  parcel of land at the Kenya-Uganda border, from the Kenya Forest Service, for the purpose of building the town of Suam, Kenya, across the Suam River from the already established town of Suam, Uganda.

In 2014, the governments of Kenya and Uganda began joint efforts to source funds from the African Development Bank for the purpose of tarmacking to grade II bitumen surface, the Kapchorwa–Suam Road in Uganda and the Suam–Endebess–Kitale–Eldoret Road on the Kenya side. It is expected that the road improvement will spur trade between the two countries. In August 2017, The EastAfrican reported that Kenya and Uganda were jointly developing a one-stop-border-crossing (OSBC) at Suam, similar to the crossings at Busia and Malaba.

See also
 Mount Elgon National Park
 Mount Elgon

References

External links
 Multinational: Uganda/Kenya: Kapchorwa-Suam-Endebess-Kitale-Eldoret Bypass Roads Project = Environmental And Social Impact Assessment (ESIA) Summary

Populated places in Trans-Nzoia County
Kenya–Uganda border crossings